Cacia scenica is a species of beetle in the family Cerambycidae. It was described by Francis Polkinghorne Pascoe in 1865. It is known from Sulawesi.

References

Cacia (beetle)
Beetles described in 1865